Skrudaliena (Formerly: Skrudaļina) is a settlement in Skrudaliena Parish, Augšdaugava Municipality in the Selonia region of Latvia.

References

External links 
Satellite map at Maplandia.com

Towns and villages in Latvia
Augšdaugava Municipality
Illuxt County
Selonia